Arrigo Carnoli (born 31 January 1932) is an Italian gymnast. He competed in eight events at the 1952 Summer Olympics.

References

External links
 

1932 births
Living people
Italian male artistic gymnasts
Olympic gymnasts of Italy
Gymnasts at the 1952 Summer Olympics
Sportspeople from Ravenna